John E. Steele (born June 3, 1949) is a senior United States district judge of the United States District Court for the Middle District of Florida.

Education and career

Steele was born in Detroit, Michigan. He received his Bachelor of Arts degree from the University of Detroit in 1971 and his Juris Doctor from the University of Detroit College of Law in 1973. Steele served as a law clerk to the Wayne County Prosecuting Attorney's Office in Detroit from 1972 to 1974. He was assistant prosecuting attorney in the Wayne County Prosecuting Attorney's Office from 1974 to 1977 and assistant prosecuting attorney in the Ingham County Prosecutor's Office in [Lansing, Michigan] from 1977 to 1980. Steele served as an Assistant United States Attorney in the United States Attorney's Office for the Western District of Michigan from 1980 to 1981. He relocated to Florida and was Assistant United States Attorney in the United States Attorney for the Middle District of Florida from 1981 to 1988. Steele was in private practice from 1988 to 1991.

Federal judicial service

He served as a United States magistrate judge of the United States District Court for the Middle District of Florida from 1991 to 2000 and was an adjunct professor at Florida Coastal School of Law from 1999 to 2000. President Bill Clinton nominated Steele to the United States District Court for the Middle District of Florida on June 6, 2000, to a new seat created by 113 Stat. 1501. Confirmed by the Senate on July 21, 2000, he received commission on July 26, 2000. He assumed senior status on June 3, 2015.

References

External links

1949 births
Living people
Judges of the United States District Court for the Middle District of Florida
Assistant United States Attorneys
Lawyers from Detroit
United States district court judges appointed by Bill Clinton
United States magistrate judges
20th-century American judges
21st-century American judges